Cephalops aeneus is a species of fly in the family Pipunculidae. It is found in the Palearctic.

References

External links
Images representing  Cephalops aeneus at BOLD

Pipunculidae
Insects described in 1810
Diptera of Europe
Taxa named by Carl Fredrik Fallén